is a Japanese professional baseball player for the Saitama Seibu Lions in Japan's Nippon Professional Baseball.

External links

1984 births
Aoyama Gakuin University alumni
Japanese baseball players
Living people
Nippon Professional Baseball outfielders
Baseball people from Ibaraki Prefecture
Saitama Seibu Lions players
Seibu Lions players